The 2014 Union Budget of India was presented by Finance Minister, Arun Jaitley on 10 July 2014,11 am. This was the first budget of Narendra Modi led NDA government.

Salient features of the budget
 provided for the development of Smart Cities in India
 provided for irrigation
5 New IITs and IIMs and four new  AIIMS in India.
New airports scheme in tier 1 and 2 cities
Schemes for development of sports across the country.

Foreign Direct Investment
FDI cap in Defense and Insurance sector has been increased to 49% from 26%.
FDI in real estate for low cost housing

Personal tax and exemption limit
 No changes in personal income tax slabs.

Budget 2014: Highlights of Finance Minister Arun Jaitley’s Budget speech

..

Reactions
Former Prime Minister of India, Manmohan Singh reacted on budget saying that "Budget lacks road-maps".
The Communist Party of India (Marxist) accused the budget as "a recipe for further enriching the rich and impoverishing the poor. "
Former Chief Minister of Delhi, Arvind Kejriwal stated that "it was a directionless budget with no steps to bring down inflation in the country".
Sharad Yadav reacted on budget saying that "This Budget shows we are standing where we were. It's like distributing toffees".
Sonia Gandhi said that Arun Jaitley copied the policies of congress government.
Rajeev Shukla stated that "This budget is intended for corporate sector and rich people. There is nothing in budget for common man"
Sudheendra Kulkarni: Smart new cities are welcome. But far bigger challenge is to make old cities smarter. Possible only with Good Governance Reforms.
Sunil Duggal: The Union Budget 2014-15 was going to be a tough balancing act for Finance Minister Mr. Arun Jaitley, given the precarious state that the Economy was in.
 President of FICCI, Sidharth Birla stated that "The FM has set the ground for repair of the economy. There has been a mix of both short-term and long-term measures geared towards boosting confidence of all key constituents."
 President of CII, Ajay S. Shriram stated that "It has covered many aspects of the population and that is big plus. The finance minister has looked at policies from 2-3 year view and this is a positive direction for higher economic growth."

See also
Union budget of India
Railway Budget

References

External links
 Budget at a glance

Union budgets of India
Modi administration
India
2014 in Indian economy